Tacinga werneri is a species of plant in the family Cactaceae. It is endemic to Brazil.  Its natural habitats are subtropical or tropical dry forests and hot deserts. It is threatened by habitat loss.

References

Sources

Flora of Brazil
Tacinga
Vulnerable plants
Taxonomy articles created by Polbot